Pharr is a city in Hidalgo County, Texas, United States.  As of the 2010 census, the city population was 70,400, and in 2019, the estimated population was 79,112. Pharr is connected by bridge to the Mexican city of Reynosa, Tamaulipas. Pharr is part of the McAllen–Edinburg–Mission and Reynosa–McAllen metropolitan areas.

Geography

Pharr is located in southern Hidalgo County at  (26.206334, –98.185174). It is bordered to the west by the city of McAllen, to the north by Edinburg, the county seat, to the east by San Juan, and to the southwest by Hidalgo. The Pharr city limits extend south in a narrow band to the Rio Grande and the Pharr–Reynosa International Bridge into Mexico.

Communities:
 Las Milpas (annexed in 1987)

History
The community was named after sugar planter Henry Newton Pharr. For a number of years centering around early 1900, Henry N. Pharr was director of the State National Bank of New Iberia, Louisiana, and was a former president of the Louisiana–Rio Grande Sugar Company and the Louisiana–Rio Grande Canal Company, which at one time owned  and which, in 1910, built the town of Pharr on this land. Pharr was the Republican nominee for Louisiana governor in 1908, as his father John Newton Pharr had been in 1896.

Pharr has grown rapidly since the late 20th century, from a population of 32,921 in 1990 to an estimated 77,320 in 2016 and 79,112 in 2019.

In 1987, Pharr annexed Las Milpas.

In 2006, Pharr received "The All-America City" award.

Climate
Pharr has a humid subtropical climate, similar to that of the Tampa Bay Area of Florida, but with less precipitation and slightly higher summer maximum temperatures. The warm season is long, with average highs and lows similar to August's from June through September.

Most precipitation occurs in the warm season, with the least precipitation distinctly occurring in the cooler winter. As September is the peak of the north Atlantic hurricane season and tropical storms and hurricanes occasionally drop copious amounts of rainfall on the region, this month tends to be by far the wettest, averaging  of precipitation.

Demographics

2020 census

As of the 2020 United States census, there were 79,715 people, 22,668 households, and 18,420 families residing in the city.

2000 census
As of the census of 2000,  46,660 people, 12,798 households, and 10,878 families were residing in the city.  The population density was 2,240.2 people/sq mi (864.9/km).  The 16,537 housing units averaged 794.0/sq mi (306.5/km).  The racial makeup of the city was 79.46% White, 0.24% African American, 0.72% Native American, 0.23% Asian, 17.32% from other races, and 2.04% from two or more races.  About 90.62% of the population was Hispanic or Latino of any race.

Of the 12,798 households, 47.1% had children under  18 living with them, 64.2% were married couples living together, 16.9% had a female householder with no husband present, and 15.0% were not families. About 13.3% of all households were made up of individuals, and 7.6% had someone living alone who was 65 or older.  The average household size was 3.64 and the average family size was 4.02.

In the city, the age distribution was 34.8% under 18, 11.3% from 18 to 24, 26.3% from 25 to 44, 15.8% from 45 to 64, and 11.9% who were 65 or older.  The median age was 27 years.  For every 100 females, there were 90.9 males.  For every 100 females age 18 and over, there were 85.7 males.

The median income for a household in the city was $24,333, and for a family was $25,916. Males had a median income of $19,169 versus $16,737 for females. The per capita income for the city was $9,462.  35.5% of the population and 30.8% of families were below the poverty line.  Of the total population, 46.6% of those under 18 and 23.1% of those 65 and older were living below the poverty line.

Government and infrastructure
Pharr City Hall is located at 118 S Cage Blvd, Pharr, Texas 78577. The Innovation and Technology Department operates its official website (http://pharr-tx.gov), as well as its local government television on Time Warner Cable channel 17.12. All current social media platforms are used to allow for interactive governmental operations.

The Pharr–Reynosa International Bridge is operated by the city of Pharr.

The Texas Department of Transportation operates the Pharr District Office in Pharr.

The United States Postal Service operates the Pharr Post Office in Pharr.

Transportation

Highways
 Pharr has I-2/U.S. 83 as its major east–west artery. U.S. 281 runs north–south through the city and intersects I-2/U.S. 83 at the center of the city and continues south to the Pharr-Reynosa International Bridge. From I-2/U.S. 83 at the center of the city north to Edinburg (and eventually to George West), U.S. 281 is co-signed with I-69C.

Education

Primary and secondary schools
The majority of Pharr is served by the Pharr-San Juan-Alamo Independent School District, which has five high schools in the city: PSJA North with around 2,700 students, PSJA Southwest Early College High School with about 1,750, Thomas Jefferson TSTEM Early College High School, PSJA Sonia M. Sotomayor Early College High School (new to 2016–17 school year), and Buell Central DAEP.

Zoned PSJAISD schools include PSJA North and PSJA Southwest.

A small fringe portion of the city is a part of the Hidalgo Independent School District. Another small portion is a part of the Valley View Independent School District, which has one campus with around 2,000 students.

In addition, residents are allowed to apply to magnet schools operated by the South Texas Independent School District.

Area colleges and universities
University of Texas Rio Grande Valley'''  in Edinburg
South Texas College in McAllen

Public libraries
Pharr Memorial Library serves the city.

Sister cities
 San Luis Potosí, San Luis Potosí, Mexico
 Zacualpan de Amilpas, Tetela del Volcan, and Ocuituco, Morelos, Mexico.

Notable people
 Leo Araguz, former NFL punter and kicker
 Pedro Borbón, relief pitcher for Major League Baseball
 Cali Carranza, Tejano musician
 Baldemar Velasquez, labor-union activist

References

External links

 City of Pharr official website
 Pharr.LIFE, community website
 Pharr, TX in Handbook of Texas Online

 
Cities in Hidalgo County, Texas
Cities in Texas
Texas
Texas populated places on the Rio Grande